Pakistan Air Force Football Club, commonly known as PAF FC, is a Pakistani professional football club based in Islamabad. It represents the Pakistan Air Force. The club is currently holders of National Challenge Cup, after defeating WAPDA 2–1 in the finals of 2018 National Challenge Cup. They were promoted to the Pakistan Premier League from the Pakistan Football Federation League after finishing second to Baloch Nushki in the 2007–08 season.

Players

Current squad

Honours
 National Football League/Pakistan Premier League
 Winners: 1985–86

 National Challenge Cup
 Winners: 2014, 2018

References

External links
PAF website

Football clubs in Pakistan
Pakistan Air Force
Military association football clubs in Pakistan
Association football clubs established in 1985
1985 establishments in Pakistan
Football in Islamabad